= Koraia =

Town of ancient Caria

Coordinates: 37°20′37″N 28°00′23″E

Koraia (Ancient Greek: Κωραια) was a town of ancient Caria, inhabited during the Hellenistic period. Its townsfolk appear in many inscriptions recovered in Caria.

Its site is located near Bağcılar in Asiatic Turkey.
